Himalay Ki God Mein is a 1965 Indian Hindi-language film directed by Vijay Bhatt starring Manoj Kumar and Mala Sinha, with Shashikala in a supporting role. The film won the Filmfare Best Movie Award and was  a "Superhit" at the box office, listed in the top 20 earners of the 1960s. The film was remade in Telugu as Doctor Babu and in Tamil as Puthiya Bhoomi.

Plot 
Sunil Mehra (played by Manoj Kumar) completes his medical studies and becomes a doctor. He is kidnapped by dacoits in the Himalayas, harassed, and left badly hurt. Phoolwa, a villager (played by Mala Sinha), finds and takes care of him until he becomes fit. Both fall in love but her dacoit father Lakhan Singh played by Jayant comes in their way. Secondly Sunil is already engaged to Neeta played by Shashikala. He then leaves for his home in the city.

He returns to the Himalayas to help poor people who do not have proper facilities and or medical care. Villagers resist his arrival as they do not trust his modern medicines and only believe in local healers. Also, Lakhan Singh again an again interrupts in his activities. Worried for him, Sunil's family sends his fiancée Neeta (played by Shashikala) to get him back. Sunil in turn asks Neeta, who is also a doctor, to stay there with him. But Neeta is not very much comfortable in village atmosphere. She returns to city. Firm in his decision, he stays and wins the hearts of villagers and also the Dacoit Lakhan Singh who finally comes to his rescue.

Cast 
 Manoj Kumar as Dr. Sunil Mehra
 Mala Sinha as Phoolwa
 Shashikala as Dr. Neeta Verma
 Jayant as Lakhan Singh
 Kanhaiyalal as Ghoghar Baba
 David Abraham as Dayal Singh
 D.K. Sapru as D.I.G. Shyam Lal Mehra
 Achala Sachdev as Mrs. Shyam Lal Mehra
 Mukri as Budhimaan
 Jeevan Kala as Bindiya

Music 
The music for the film was composed by the duo Kalyanji Anandji.

Awards 

 13th Filmfare Awards:

Won

 Best Film – Shri Prakash Pictures
 Best Editing – Pratap Dave

Nominated

 Best Actress – Mala Sinha
 Best Supporting Actress – Shashikala
 Best Music Director – Kalyanji–Anandji
 Best Lyricist – Indeevar for "Ek Tu Naa Mila"
 Best Female Playback Singer – Lata Mangeshkar for "Ek Tu Naa Mila"

References

External links 
 

1965 films
1960s Hindi-language films
Films scored by Kalyanji Anandji
Hindi films remade in other languages
Films directed by Vijay Bhatt